John Roberts (born May 5, 1944) is an English musician residing in Schenectady, New York.

He is best known for his musical collaborations with Tony Barrand.  As Roberts and Barrand, they performed a cappella and accompanied performances of traditional English folk music.  They also performed and recorded fare such as sea shanties of the North Atlantic, and an album of traditional drinking songs.  The duo was also half of the related act Nowell Sing We Clear—which in addition to a number of albums—performs an annual yuletide concert series.

Born in England, Roberts moved to the United States to study graduate level psychology at Cornell University, where he formed his longtime music partnership with Tony Barrand in 1968.

Roberts also has a solo career, is a member of the trio Ye Mariners All (with John Rockwell and Larry Young), and performs regularly with upstate New York's Broken String Band. 
He has 1 brother called Terry. His niece is called Elizabeth. His great niece and nephew  are called Harry and Charlotte-Louise.

Discography

Solo
Sea Fever (2003) Golden Hind Music
 "Campañero"
 "Diego's Bold Shore"
 "The Bonny Ship the Diamond"
 "Candlelight Fisherman"
 "Farewell Nancy"
 "The Weeping Willow Tree"
 "The Boatman's Cure"
 "Short Jacket and White Trousers"
 "Sir Patrick Spens"
 "Let the Bulgine Run/Sally in the Garden/Hog-Eye Man"
 "The Black Cook"
 "The Saucy Sailor"
 "The Old Figurehead Carver"
 "What Fortunes Guide a Sailor/Leave Her Johnny"

Ye Mariners All
Songs of the Sea (2003) Golden Hind Music
 "The 'Fame' of Salem"
 "Marcherot"
 "The Steam Packet"
 "Wings of a Goney"
 "Pique la Baleine"
 "Three Jolly Fishermen"
 "Jack Robinson"
 "Old Billy Riley-O"
 "Hourra les Filles"
 "Serafina"
 "Rolling Down to Old Maui"
 "Yangtse River Chantey"
 "The 'Balaena'"
 "Hullabaloo Belay"
 "You Gentlemen of Boston"
 "Nantucket Point/Off She Goes"
 "Noah's Ark Chantey"
 "The 'Jamestown' Homeward Bound"

Roberts and Barrand

 Spencer the Rover is Alive and Well… (1971, 2001)
 Across the Western Ocean (1973, 2000)
 Mellow With Ale From the Horn (1975)
 Dark Ships in the Forest (1977, 1997)
 Live at Holsteins! (1983)
 A Present from the Gentlemen (1992)
 Naulakha Redux (1997)
 Heartoutbursts (1998)
 Twiddlum Twaddlum (2003)

Nowell Sing We Clear

 Nowell Sing We Clear (1977)
 To Welcome In The Spring (1980)
 The Second Nowell (1981)
 Nowell Sing We Clear, Vol. 3 (1985)
 Nowell Sing We Four (1988)
 the best of Nowell Sing We Clear 1975–1986 (1989)
 Hail Smiling Morn! (1995)
 Just Say Nowell (2000)
 Nowell Nowell Nowell! (2008)

John Roberts and Debra Cowan
Ballads Long & Short (2015) Golden Hinds Music
 "Drive Dull Care Away"
 "The Broadside Man"
 "The Tailor's Breeches"
 "Fair Annie"
 "Garners Gay"
 "Combing the Mane"
 "The 'Cornstalk'"
 "The Bonny Hind"
 "Twa Corbies"
 "When Fortune Turns the Wheel"
 "Gypsum Davy"
 "Jim Jones"
 "Anderson's Coast"
 "Bold Riley"

References

External links
 Golden Hind Music (official site)
 John Roberts Music (official site)

American folk musicians
Cornell University alumni
Maritime music
Living people
1944 births